A search game is a two-person zero-sum game which takes place in a set called the search space. The searcher can choose any continuous trajectory subject to a maximal velocity constraint. It is always assumed that neither the searcher nor the hider has any knowledge about the movement of the other player until their distance apart is less than or equal to the discovery radius and at this very moment capture occurs. As mathematical models, search games can be applied to areas such as hide-and-seek games that children play or representations of some tactical military situations. The area of search games was introduced in the last chapter of Rufus Isaacs' classic book "Differential Games" and has been developed further by Shmuel Gal and Steve Alpern. The princess and monster game deals with a moving target.

Strategy
A natural strategy to search for a stationary target in a graph is to find a minimal closed curve L that covers all the arcs of the graph. (L is called a Chinese postman tour). Then, traverse L with probability 1/2 for each direction. This strategy seems to work well if the graph is Eulerian. In general, this random Chinese postman tour is indeed an optimal search strategy if and only if the graph consists of a set of Eulerian graphs connected in a tree-like structure. A misleadingly simple example of a graph not in this family consists of two nodes connected by three arcs. The random Chinese postman tour (equivalent to traversing the three arcs in a random order) is not optimal, and the optimal way to search these three arcs is complicated.

Unbounded domains

In general, the reasonable framework for searching an unbounded domain, as in the case of an online algorithm, is to use a normalized cost function (called the competitive ratio in Computer Science literature). The minimax trajectory for problems of these types is always a geometric sequence (or exponential function for continuous problems). This result yields an easy method to find the minimax trajectory by minimizing over a single parameter (the generator of this sequence) instead of searching over the whole trajectory space. This tool has been used for the linear search problem, i.e., finding a target on the infinite line, which has attracted much attention over several decades and has been analyzed as a search game. It has also been used to find a minimax trajectory for searching a set of concurrent rays. Optimal searching in the plane is performed by using exponential spirals. 
Searching a set of concurrent rays was later re-discovered in Computer Science literature as the 'cow-path problem'.

References

 

Non-cooperative games
Search algorithms